St. Clair College of Applied Arts and Technology is a college in the Southwestern Ontario counties of Essex and Chatham-Kent.

Campus
Its main administration and largest campus sites are in Windsor, Ontario, Canada. In addition, other campuses are located in Chatham and Wallaceburg.  In 2007, St. Clair College expanded to downtown Windsor by purchasing the former City of Windsor owned Cleary International Centre, renaming it St. Clair College Centre for the Arts. In 2009, St. Clair College bought the former City of Windsor owned Salvation Army building in downtown Windsor for $1. With a $5 million grant from the federal government, the building was turned into a state of the art journalism school; the first of its kind in Canada. In 2014, St. Clair College built a new sports complex at the main campus, called the SportsPlex.

History
The college has its roots in the Western Ontario Institute of Technology, founded in 1958 to supplement the then-Ryerson Institute in Toronto, now Toronto Metropolitan University. With the advent of the Colleges of Applied Arts and Technology, St. Clair was founded in 1966; the two institutions were merged a year later. Growth of the college has generally paralleled that of Windsor. Colleges of Applied Arts and Technology were established on May 21, 1965. It is an Ontario College of Applied Arts and Technology. The school was founded in 1966 as part of a provincial initiative to create many such institutions to provide career-oriented diploma and certificate courses, as well as continuing education programs to Ontario communities.

St. Clair College celebrated its 50th anniversary in September 2017.

Campuses

Windsor, Ontario
 The Windsor (South) Campus is the main campus, 2000 Talbot Road West
Ford Center for Excellence in Manufacturing (FCEM) 
 Anthony P. Toldo Centre for Applied Health Sciences 
 SportsPlex Fitness Centre
 The St. Clair Center for the Arts is located on the riverfront in downtown Windsor, 201 Riverside Drive West 
 MediaPlex is located in downtown Windsor, 275 Victoria Avenue

Chatham-Kent, Ontario
 The Thames Campus is located on 1001 Grand Avenue West, Chatham
HealthPlex

Programs
St. Clair College offers more than 100 diploma, certificate, degree and post graduate certificate programs.
 The college offers a Bachelor of Applied Technology (Mechanical Engineering Technology - Automotive Product Design). 
 The college also offers Apprentice programs, English as a Second Language (ESL) and Post Secondary career programs.
 Liberal Arts & Sciences
Academic and Career Entrance; College and Employment Preparation; English as a Second Language; General Arts and Science; Health Foundations; Pre-Business; Pre-Health Science; Pre-Nursing and Pre-Technology
 Business & Information Technology
Business; Business Administration; Computer Systems Technician/Technology (#1 College Computer networking program in Ontario); International Business; Office Administration; Business Accounting; Mobile Applications Development; Internet Applications and Web Development
Community Studies
Autism and Behavioral Science; Child and Youth Worker; Developmental Service Worker;  Early Childhood Education; Educational Assistant; Law Clerk; Law and Security Administration; Native Community Worker; Native Early Childhood Education; Community and Justice Services; Restorative Justice Practices
Engineering Technologies
Architectural; Biomedical Engineering Technology; Chemical Laboratory; Civil Engineering; Construction Engineering; Electronics Engineering; Manufacturing; Mechanical; Power Engineering; 
Health Sciences
Concurrent Bachelor of Science/Medical Laboratory Science; Dental Assisting; Dental Hygiene; Medical Laboratory; Nursing – BScN; Paramedic; Personal Support Worker; Pharmacy Technician; Practical Nursing; Respiratory Therapy; Veterinary Technician
Media, Art & Design
Advertising; Animation; Entertainment Technology; Graphic Design; Hospitality Management; Interior Design; Journalism; Music Theatre Performance; Tourism and Travel
Skilled Trades
Chef; Culinary Management; Electrical Techniques; Esthetician; Hairstylist; Heating, Refrigeration & Air Conditioning; Horticulture; Motive Power Technician; Welding; Woodworking
Apprenticeship
Bachelor's degree Programs:
Bachelor of Science – Nursing; Bachelor of Science/Medical Laboratory Science; Bachelor of Arts/ Bachelor of Education/ Early Childhood Education.Bachelor of Applied Technology-Mechanical Engineering Technology - Automotive Product Design.

Student government
The college has of student regulated governments that handle much of the student related activities at the college. They are the Student Representative Council (SRC), the Student Athletic Association (SAA), and the Thames Students Inc. (TSI).

Scholarships and bursaries
St. Clair College scholarships for Aboriginal, First Nations and Métis students include: Métis Nation of Ontario, St. Clair College Bursary.

Strike of 2017 
Effective Monday, October 16, 2017, at 12:01am, the team bargaining on behalf of the province's 24 Colleges and the OPSEU union representing 12,000 full-time faculty, partial load faculty, counsellors and librarians, could not reach an agreement, and all faculty entered a work stoppage. As of 12:40pm, November 6, 2017, after a number of days of bargaining, Ontario colleges presented a new offer of settlement to OSPEU. The colleges asked that faculty be able to vote on this offer of settlement and requested the Ontario Labour Relations Board to arrange a vote. The colleges asked OPSEU to suspend the strike in order to have faculty return to the classroom whilst the vote was being arranged. Classes, however, remained suspended. On November 21, the strike was lifted and classes were resumed, however, many initial issues were not resolved.

Photo gallery

See also 
 Canadian government scientific research organizations
 Canadian industrial research and development organizations
 Canadian Interuniversity Sport
 Canadian university scientific research organizations
 Higher education in Ontario
 List of colleges and universities named after people
 List of colleges in Ontario

References

External links

Official website

Colleges in Ontario
Educational institutions established in 1966
Education in Windsor, Ontario
Education in Chatham-Kent
Buildings and structures in Windsor, Ontario
Buildings and structures in Chatham-Kent
1966 establishments in Ontario